The Stanhope Football Club is based in the small Victorian town of Stanhope, near Kyabram. The Club are known as the 'Lions' wearing a maroon jumper with gold chevron. Stanhope has competed in the Kyabram & District Football League since 1995.

Premierships

Kyabram & District Football Association (1921)
 Nil

 Cooma Football Association (1922)
 1922

Kyabram & District Football Association (1927-1928)
 Nil

 Goulburn Valley Junior Association (1929-1932)
 1931, 1932

Kyabram & District Football Association (1933-1945)
 1936, 1938, 1944

Goulburn Valley Football League (1946-1975)
 Nil

Heathcote District Football League (1976-1994)
 1976, 1986, 1987

Kyabram & District Football League (1995-present)
2000, 2003, 2007, 2008

KDFL Best & Fairest Winners
Darryl Harrison (2003)

KDFL Leading Goal Kickers
Jodie Canavan - 116 (1998)
Gavin Exell - 104 (2000)
Gavin Exell - 112 (2001)
Gavin Exell - 115 (2003)

References

External sources

Kyabram & District Football League clubs